R553 road may refer to:
 R553 road (Ireland)
 R553 (South Africa)